The Vieux Carré is an IBA official cocktail made with rye whiskey, cognac, sweet vermouth, Bénédictine, and Peychaud's bitters.  It originated with Walter Bergeron, a bartender at the Carousel Bar in Hotel Monteleone, New Orleans. The name is French for "old square”, in reference to the city's French Quarter neighborhood.  The drink is classified as one of the Unforgettables by the IBA.

See also
 List of cocktails

References

Cocktails with brandy
Cocktails with vermouth
Cocktails with bitters
Cocktails with rye whisky
Cocktails with liqueur